Concepción de Buenos Aires   is a town and municipality, in Jalisco in central-western Mexico. The municipality covers an area of  455.13 km2.

As of 2020, the municipality had a total population of 6,334.

References

Municipalities of Jalisco